A dip bar is a piece of fitness equipment that consists of a U-shaped bar, usually about 1" (2.5 cm) in diameter, which surrounds the user's body at the waist. It is designed for the performance of, and named after, the dip exercise.

In addition to this exercise, much like the trap bar can be used for deadlifts, a dip bar has other potential uses. It can, for example, be used to do handstand pushups, or the forearms can lie on it to be used as a (probably less comfortable) captain's chair for doing things such as knee raises. When dip bars have clearance under the handles, they also allow the exerciser to do things like hip abduction leg raises, to work muscles like the gluteus medius.

Dip bars that are high enough can also be used via having the hands below the bar instead of on top of them, using the finger flexors to hang on. They can be used to hold the very top motion of a pull-up (generally they are not high enough to allow significant range of motion in this movement, even if the knees are bent or pulled to the chest) as well as to perform supine rows.

See also
Parallettes
Rings (gymnastics)
Chin-up bar

Weight training equipment